Peggy Provost (born 19 September 1977) is a French former football midfielder. She played for FCF Juvisy in the French First Division.

She was a member of the French national team for eight years, taking part in the 2003 World Cup and 2005 European Championship.

Titles
 3 French Leagues (1997, 2003, 2006)
 1 French Cup (2005)

References

External links
 
 

1977 births
Living people
French women's footballers
France women's international footballers
2003 FIFA Women's World Cup players
Sportspeople from Bourg-en-Bresse
Women's association football midfielders
Paris FC (women) players
Footballers from Auvergne-Rhône-Alpes